= Trieste Photo Days =

International photography festival

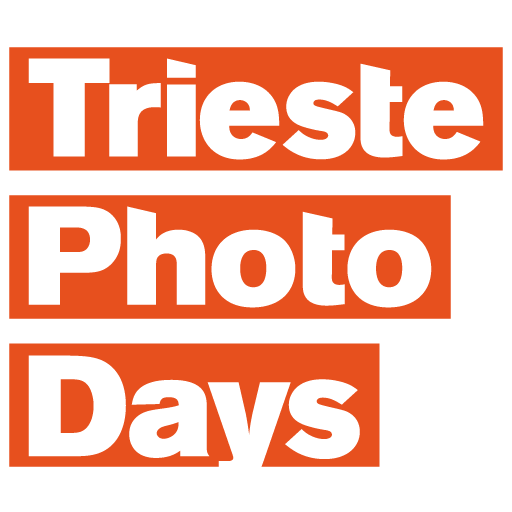

Trieste Photo Days is an international photography festival established in 2013 in Trieste, Friuli-Venezia Giulia. The festival takes place annually over two weekends and is articulated through exhibitions, events, meetings with photographers, talks, workshops, classes, award ceremonies for contests and presentations of unpublished editorial projects. Trieste Photo Days is organized by the cultural associations dotART and Exhibit Around APS, with the support of the Municipality of Trieste – Department for Culture and Tourism Policies. The event includes a variety of exhibitions by both Italian and foreign photographers.

The festival takes place between late October and early November. The Trieste Photo Fringe is a spin-off initiative of the main event, featured in various venues in the city center. The festival presents content related to the collective projects of Exhibit Around, the festival's organizing association which every year organizes contests open to photographers worldwide, and to the contest Urban Photo Awards.

During the tenth edition of the festival, in 2023, over 1,600 photographs by more than 700 photographers from various parts of the world were exhibited.
